The Finnish Elite Athlete's Union (SHU) is a trade union representing professional sportspeople in Finland.

The union was founded in 2002 and consists of associations for specific sports, plus a section for individual athletes.  It has about 2,600 members, with about 1,500 being football players.  Unusually for a trade union, it does not involve itself in wage negotiations, but focuses on social security, and helping athletes compare for life after their sporting career has finished.

In 2012, the union affiliated to the Central Organisation of Finnish Trade Unions.

Sections
 Basketball Players' Association
 Elite Baseball Players
 Finnish Ice Hockey
 Football Players' Union
 Race Athletes' Association

References

Sports trade unions
Trade unions in Finland
Trade unions established in 2002